Chung Jong-Soo (born 27 March 1961) is a South Korean former international footballer who played professionally as a defender for Yukong Elephants and Hyundai Horang-i. He represented South Korea at the 1986 FIFA World Cup and 1990 FIFA World Cup.

External links
 
 
 

1961 births
Living people
South Korean footballers
South Korea international footballers
Jeju United FC players
Ulsan Hyundai FC players
Ulsan Hyundai FC managers
K League 1 players
1986 FIFA World Cup players
1990 FIFA World Cup players
Asian Games medalists in football
Footballers at the 1986 Asian Games
Footballers at the 1990 Asian Games
Asian Games gold medalists for South Korea
Asian Games bronze medalists for South Korea
Medalists at the 1986 Asian Games
Medalists at the 1990 Asian Games
Association football defenders
South Korean football managers